Endonuclease V (endoV) is a highly conserved endonuclease enzyme family. The primary function of endoV differs significantly in prokaryotes and eukaryotes, as suggested by studies on the E. coli and human orthologs.

In prokaryotes endoV is primarily a deoxyribonuclease involved in DNA repair of deoxyinosine introduced into the genome by deamidation of adenine bases (EC 3.1.21.7). However, it has broad substrate specificity and can also act on other types of DNA lesions as well as on inosine-containing RNA.

In eukaryotes endoV is primarily a ribonuclease and cleaves single-stranded RNA at the 3' position relative to an inosine base, which may be present due to RNA editing by deaminase enzymes (EC 3.1.26.-). The human endoV localizes to the cytoplasm and nucleoli, suggesting a possible role in processes involving ribosomal RNA. The human gene symbol is ENDOV.

References 

Ribonucleases
EC 3.1.21